Austrocortinarius is a genus of fungi in the family Cortinariaceae.

Taxonomy 
The genus was created in 2022 when the family Cortinariaceae, which previously contained only the one genus of Cortinarius was reclassified based on genomic data and split into the genera of Cortinarius, Aureonarius, Austrocortinarius, Calonarius, Cystinarius, Hygronarius, Mystinarius, Phlegmacium, Thaxterogaster and Volvanarius.

Etymology 
The name Austrocortinarius derives from 'austro' meaning South and Cortinarius. Currently the genus is only known from the Southern Hemisphere and so it is named in reference to this.

Species 
As of January 2023, Species Fungorum accepted 2 species of Austrocortinarius.

 Austrocortinarius australiensis (Cleland & Cheel) Liimat. & Niskanen (2022)
 Austrocortinarius victoriaensis (Liimat.) Niskanen (2022)

References 

Agaricales genera
Cortinariaceae